Borbaad  is an 2014 Indian Bengali language action film directed by Raj Chakraborty and debut starring Indraneil Sengupta's nephew Bonny Sengupta and Rittika Sen in lead roles. Trailer of this film was released on 6 June 2014. The film released on 14 August 2014. The film is a remake of Tamil movie Polladavan.

Plot
Joy, a worthless chap whose ambition in life is to buy a bike so that he can impress Nandini. While his life improves after he buys the bike as he lands a job soon after, trouble starts soon after, when his bike gets stolen. He starts getting into an altercation with Imran, the younger brother of Akram, the local don, who is extremely hot headed than his elder brother. However the elder brother never harms elderly people or people other than target and only targets people like him. How Joy manages to keep up his rivalry with Imran and yet come out unscathed till the end and retrieves his bike is what the story is all about.

Cast
 Bonny Sengupta as Joy
 Rittika Sen as Nandini
 Mainak Banerjee as local goon Imran
 Sudip Mukherjee as Akram, Imran's elder brother and a dreaded gangster
 Tulika Basu as Joy's Mother
 Prabir Dutta as Joy's Father
 Vashkar Dev as Rajnikant
 Pradip Dhar as Ali Bhai
 Anindita Raychaudhury

Soundtrack

Critical Reception
Borbaad got mostly mixed to negative reviews. Madhushree Ghosh of The Times Of India rated the movie 2 and a half stars out of 5. She states that Raj was not in a mood of making a good plot unlike his earlier films such as Proloy and Kanamachi and that's why he leans on making a merely dull love story and some amount of South Indian Film oriented violence. She was also highly critical towards the lead characters' performances stating a emotionless, dull, charisma-lacking acting by both Bonny and Rittika but praised the performance of Sudip Mukherjee as a Muslim Mafia Don. Shoma A. Chatterji of The Indian Express commented that "The editing and cinematography of the action scenes are credible and good but what fails the film miserably is the performance of the romantic lead portrayed by Bonny and Ritika. The only good thing about the movie is Sudip Mukherjee as a ruthless Mafia leader. But ultimately the film is a not-so good one of Raj Chakrobarty". But still it was a blockbuster at box-office

References

External links 

2014 films
Bengali remakes of Tamil films
Films scored by Arindam Chatterjee
Bengali-language Indian films
2010s Bengali-language films
Films directed by Raj Chakraborty